A battle of egos is a phrase used metaphorically to describe competitions that are based on pride and often entail prodigious and arrogant demonstrations of prowess. The idiom is usually used figuratively and often refer to forms of ego-driven battling in a pejorative manner. A type of dueling similar to a pissing contest, ego battles are often seen as an arrogant way to determine who is the "bigger man" (as far as being superior right in an argument) by a competitive methodology that is not especially productive.

Ego battles
A Tehran newspaper described the dispute between George W. Bush and Saddam Hussein as a battle of egos. The competition between television advertisements during the Super Bowl has been described as a battle of egos nicknamed "The Ego Bowl". A 1998 collective bargaining dispute in the National Basketball Association was also described as a battle of egos.

See also
 Egotism
 Narcissism
 Pissing contest

References

Dueling
Ego psychology
Metaphors
Narcissism